The Loschbour man (also Loschbur man) is a skeleton of Homo sapiens from the European Mesolithic discovered in 1935 in Mullerthal, in the commune of Waldbillig, Luxembourg.

History

The skeleton, nearly complete, was discovered on 7 October 1935 under a rock shelter in Mullerthal on the banks of the Black Ernz. It was found by amateur archeologist and school teacher Nicolas Thill. It is now at the National Museum of Natural History in Luxembourg City.

Life
Loschbour man was a hunter-gatherer, and the flint tools used for stalking and killing prey (wild boar and deer) were found by his body. He was one of the last of his kind, soon to be supplanted by new populations more likely to herd rather than hunt—and with paler skins. According to DNA tests reported in 2014, Loschbour man was male, was described as having an "intermediate" to light skin tone (90%), brown or black hair (98%), and likely blue eyes (56%). In contrast to 90% of modern Europeans, he was lactose-intolerant.

The cremated remains of another person, likely an adult woman, were found nearby, in a pit which was first excavated in the 1930s and later rediscovered. The bones of the feet were absent, and remains from the thorax underrepresented, and the remaining bones had scrapemarks, evidencing a de-fleshing treatment likely before cremation, including removal of the mandible and scraping of the skull.

Dating
Loschbour man lived over 8,000 years ago, making the skeleton the oldest human remains found in the country. The remains contained Y-DNA of the Haplogroup I2a-M423*. DNA testing (two molars presented good samples) indicates that Western Hunter-Gatherers like Loschbour man "contributed ancestry to all Europeans but not to near-Easterners".

Media, science
The results of the 2014 DNA testing allowed the Luxembourg Centre National de Recherche Archéologique and the Musée National d'Histoire et d'Art to make a 3-D reconstruction of the man. L'homme de Loschbour is a 2012 animated movie, seven minutes long, by Nic Herber. "Redonner vie à l’Homme de Loschbour" was a one-day conference at the National Museum of Natural History, which presented an overview of the results of recent investigations.

See also 
List of human evolution fossils, Holocene

References

External links
 L'homme de Loschbour, 3-D animation by Nic Herber, 2012

Homo sapiens fossils
Prehistoric Luxembourg
1935 archaeological discoveries
Mesolithic Europe
Hunter-gatherers of Europe